Xilinxa Dam is a dam on the Xilinxa River, lying between Nqamakwe and Idutywa in the Eastern Cape, South Africa.

See also
List of reservoirs and dams in South Africa
List of rivers of South Africa

References 
 List of South African Dams from the Department of Water Affairs

Dams in South Africa